Eleonora di Garzia di Toledo or Leonor Álvarez de Toledo Osorio (March 1553 – 10 July 1576), more often known as "Leonora" or "Dianora", was the daughter of García Álvarez de Toledo, 4th Marquis of Villafranca, Duke of Fernandina. Leonora was born in Florence, where she was brought up by Cosimo I de' Medici, Grand Duke of Tuscany and his wife Eleanor of Toledo, her aunt and namesake. Betrothed to their son Pietro at the age of 15, she blossomed under the wing of Pietro's older sister, the artistic patron Isabella, into a vivacious and witty beauty. Her marriage, like Isabella's, was not a success, and she followed her mentor's example of taking lovers. For this reason, Pietro had her brought in 1576 to the country retreat of Cafaggiolo, where he strangled her to death with a dog leash. Cosimo's successor, Francesco I, tacitly approved the murder, and Pietro was never brought to justice for it.

Until recently, little was known of Leonora di Garzia di Toledo, and she was not identified as the sitter of several portraits of her. The facts of her life have emerged from the growing scholarship on Isabella de' Medici, with whom she has much in common. In the view of art historian Gabrielle Langdon, "Her story is valuable in revealing attitudes and legalities attendant on the lives and decorum of women in the early-modern Italian court".

Biography

Early life
Born at the Florentine court in March 1553, Leonora was the daughter of García Álvarez de Toledo y Osorio, Marquis of Villafranca del Bierzo and Duke of Fernandina, and Vittoria d'Ascanio Colonna.  Her father and mother were staying in Florence because García Álvarez had charge of the castles of Valdichiana in the region. When Vittoria Colonna died a few months later, Leonora was left in the care of her aunt Eleonora, the Duchess of Florence. Eleonora and Cosimo raised her lovingly at the Medici court, where she remained for the rest of her life, in effect a menina—a girl groomed for a life at court, in the Spanish tradition of courtly fostering.

García Álvarez went on to become the Viceroy of Catalonia (1558–64) and the Viceroy of Sicily (1564–66) on behalf of Philip II of Spain and served as Philip's commander at the Battle of Lepanto in 1571. He was the son of Pedro Álvarez de Toledo (1484–1553), the Spanish Viceroy of Naples. The family came from the grandee class of Spanish nobles, the highest in the land, which was often entrusted with viceroyal powers in Spanish and Habsburg territories; Toledo has been called "Christendom's wealthiest benefice". In 1539,  Pedro Alvarez de Toledo's daughter Eleonora had been married to the duke of Florence, Cosimo I de' Medici, as part of a process of legitimising the Medici ducal title, granted only in 1532, under Habsburg auspices. She went on to bear Cosimo 11 children, including the future grand dukes Francesco and Ferdinando, as well as Pietro and Isabella.

After Eleonora died in 1562, Cosimo's daughter Isabella replaced her as the first lady of Florence. She acted as a surrogate consort and also took over the supervision of Leonora's upbringing. The red-headed Leonora, who possessed a natural charm, was popular in the Medici family. At the age of five, she was reported as being a comfort to Cosimo's second daughter Lucrezia, from whom she became inseparable, when Lucrezia was apart from her husband Alfonso d'Este. Lucrezia died in 1561, leaving Isabella as Cosimo's only surviving daughter; the duke was, however, extremely fond of Leonora, and treated her as his own daughter. He was charmed by her vivacity and physical vigour—she delighted in horsemanship and arms—though he occasionally gently reminded her to behave with more decorum. Owing to the close family and political ties between the House of Medici and the viceroyal family of  Toledo, a marriage was arranged between Leonora and Cosimo's son Pietro, with whom she had grown up and who was of a similar age. The couple were betrothed in 1568 when Leonora was 15, with the approval of Philip II of Spain. Garcia Álvarez de Toledo provided her with a dowry of 40,000 gold ducats. They were married at the Palazzo Vecchio in April 1571, and it was reported that Pietro had to be forced to consummate the union. On 10 February 1573, Leonora gave birth to a son, Cosimo ("Cosimino"), who was the sole male Medici heir in this generation until his death three years later, in August 1576, one month after his mother's death.

Married life
For Leonora, the marriage brought both advantages and disadvantages. On the one hand, it cemented her relationship with one of the richest families in Europe and allowed her to remain at a court where women were often granted more freedom, or at least discretion, than elsewhere; on the other hand, Pietro was the least stable of the Medici offspring, exhibiting from an early age a cruel and disturbed temperament that troubled his parents. As a result, the marriage, unlike that of Cosimo and Eleonora, was never a physical and emotional success. In this it resembled that of Isabella de' Medici, whose protégée Leonora became, and Paolo Giordano I Orsini. Duke Cosimo had married his beloved daughter Isabella into the House of Orsini for political reasons, to strengthen his position on the borders of southern Tuscany. Although Isabella had two children by Paolo Giordano, she had chosen not to live at her husband's castle at Bracciano or in Rome, where he conducted his political and amorous affairs. Instead, with Cosimo's permission, she had remained in Florence, cultivating an artistic salon at her Villa Baroncelli in the south of the city, and discreetly taking lovers, notably Troilo Orsini, a cousin of her husband's. Leonora became part of Isabella's circle and renowned for her beauty and vivacity. Like Isabella, she sponsored charities and the arts, serving as the patron of the literary Accademia degli Alterati. Neglected by her husband, she also followed Isabella's example in taking lovers. Under the libertarian Cosimo, such behaviour was tolerated as long as discretion was maintained and the marriages reaped political advantages. The women's respective husbands conducted affairs of their own, leading largely separate lives.

Thus matters stood until the death of Cosimo, by then raised to the title of grand duke, in 1574. His successor, the reclusive Grand Duke Francesco, was, however, very different. Though he maintained a mistress of his own, much to the distress of his wife, Joanna of Austria, Cosimo's eldest son was a much less sociable and tolerant ruler than his father. Rather than attend court and participate in the artistic life of Florence, he preferred to pursue science, often locking himself up in his laboratory in the Casino of San Marco to carry out experiments in alchemy, poisons, and porcelain-making. Unfortunately for Isabella, her brother did not look upon her lifestyle as indulgently as Cosimo. While he continued to cultivate the advantageous relations between her husband's house and Florence, he was less willing to turn a blind eye to the behaviour of Isabella and Leonora and to the complaints of their spouses, for whom their adultery was a question of honour rather than jealousy. Eleven years younger than Isabella, Leonora was somewhat less prudent in her amorous adventures. Neither woman, however, grasped the danger posed to them by the new regime or the extremity of the plotting that began to coil against them.

Death
On 11 July 1576, Pietro de' Medici sent a note to his brother, Grand Duke Francesco, from the Villa Medici at Cafaggiolo, north of Florence: "Last night at six hours an accident occurred to my wife and she died. Therefore Your Highness be at peace and write me what I should do, and if I should come back or not." The next day, Francesco wrote to his brother Ferdinando in Rome: "Last night, around five o'clock, a really terrible accident happened to Donna Leonora. She was found in bed, suffocated, and Don Pietro and the others were not in time to revive her".

In fact, Leonora's death was not an accident: Pietro had murdered her in cold blood, with Francesco's connivance. She was 23. Six days later, in a similar manner, her best friend, Isabella de' Medici, was strangled by her husband, Paolo Giordano, and an assistant at the remote Medici villa at Cerreto Guidi. Francesco announced the death of his sister as an accident. On 29 July, the ambassador of the Duchy of Ferrara wrote in code to Alfonso d'Este:

I advise Your Excellency of the announcement of the death of Lady Isabella; of which I heard as soon as I arrived in Bologna, [and] has displeased as many as had the Lady Leonora's; both ladies were strangled, one at Cafaggiolo and the other at Cerreto. Lady Leonora was strangled on Tuesday night; having danced until two o'clock, and having gone to bed, she was surprised by Lord Pietro [with] a dog leash at her throat, and after much struggle to save herself, finally expired. And the same Lord Pietro bears the sign, having two fingers of his hand injured by [them being] bitten by the lady. And if he had not called for help two wretches from Romagna, who claim to have been summoned there precisely for this purpose, he would perhaps have fared worse. The poor lady, as far as we can understand, made a very strong defence, as was seen by the bed, which was found all convulsed, and by the voices which were heard by the entire household. As soon as she died, she was placed in a coffin prepared there for this event, and taken to Florence in a litter at six o'clock in the morning, led by those from the villa, and accompanied with eight white tapers [carried] by six brothers and four priests; she was interred as if she were a commoner.

The diarist Agostino Lapini recorded that everyone knew very well that Leonora had been killed. "[S]he was ... beautiful, gracious, genteel, becoming, charming, affable," he wrote, "and above all had two eyes in her head which were like two stars in their beauty". Bastiano Arditi recorded that she was "deposited in a box, in San Lorenzo, without any other ceremonies".

At first, Grand Duke Francesco put it about that Leonora had died of a heart attack. But the Florence grapevine knew otherwise, and the Spanish were outraged at this treatment of such a high-ranking subject of their crown. Under pressure, Francesco eventually admitted the truth. He wrote to Philip II of Spain, on whose favour his title depended: "Although in the letter I had told you of Donna Eleonora's accident, I have nevertheless to say to His Catholic Majesty that Lord Pietro our brother had taken her life himself because of the treason she had committed through behaviour unbecoming to a lady ... We wish that His Majesty should know the truth ... and at the first opportunity he will be sent the proceedings through which she should have known with what just reasons Lord Pietro acted".

The "proceedings" Francesco had in mind concerned the documented behaviour of Leonora's lover Bernardino Antinori, who had often been seen publicly with her in her coach. Francesco had imprisoned Antinori, a hero of the Battle of Lepanto and member of the prestigious Order of Saint Stephen, on Elba in June 1576, having briefly imprisoned him earlier in the year for brawling. Love letters and poems written by Antinori, extolling Leonora's beauty and charms in minute Petrarchian detail, were "found hidden in her foot stool". Antinori was strangled in his cell two days before Leonora met the same fate. There was also a political dimension to the murders, because Antinori and another associate of Leonora's, Pierino Ridolfi—according at least to Ridolfi's confession under torture—were implicated in an anti-Medici vendetta led by Orazio Pucci. For this reason, Francesco convinced himself that Leonora's misdemeanours had also encompassed treason.

Francesco's approval meant that Pietro was never brought to justice for Leonora's murder, despite the protests of her brother Pedro Álvarez de Toledo y Colonna that her death was unacceptable. However, just over a year after the murder, Francesco exiled Pietro to the Spanish court, where he largely spent the rest of his life, visiting Florence only to beg money to pay his gambling debts. Francesco sent Pietro away "to see if he makes a man of this house and rises above the indolence that vainly consumes the best years of his youth". Pietro died in 1604, unreformed and mired in debt.

Notes

References

Citations

Sources
Langdon, Gabrielle. Medici Women: Portraits of Power, Love, and Betrayal. Toronto: University of Toronto Press, 2007. .
Murphy, Caroline P. Isabella de' Medici: The Glorious Life and Tragic End of a Renaissance Princess. London: Faber and Faber, 2008. .
Pilliod, Elizabeth. Pontormo, Bronzino, Allori: A Genealogy of Florentine Art. New Haven (CT): Yale University Press, 2001. .

House of Medici
1553 births
16th-century Italian nobility
Italian murder victims
1576 deaths
Eleonora
Renaissance women
16th-century Italian women
Italian people of Spanish descent